Pornassio is a comune (municipality) in the Province of Imperia in the Italian region Liguria, located about  southwest of Genoa and about  northwest of Imperia.

Pornassio borders the following municipalities: Armo, Cosio di Arroscia, Montegrosso Pian Latte, Ormea, Pieve di Teco, and Rezzo.

Demographic evolution

References

Cities and towns in Liguria